Crazy Horse (c. 1840–1877) was an American Sioux chief.

Crazy Horse or Krazy Horse may also refer to:

Clubs
 Crazy Horse (cabaret), a French night club
 Crazy Horse, Stockholm, a defunct tavern in Stockholm, Sweden
 The Crazy Horse, a Lebanese cabaret and brothel
 Crazy Horse, a fictional nightclub managed by Adriana La Cerva in The Sopranos

Film
 Crazy Horse (film), a 1996 western film
 Chief Crazy Horse (film), a 1955 western movie starring Victor Mature

Music
 Crazy Horse (band), an American rock band associated with Neil Young
 Crazy Horse (album)
 Crazy Horse (Paradiso Girls album)
 "Crazy Horses" (song), a 1972 song by The Osmonds, covered by a.o. KMFDM

People with the nickname
 Charles Bennett (fighter) (born 1979), American martial arts fighter
 Kandia Crazy Horse, American musician and rock critic
 Mike Cuellar (1937–2010), American professional baseball pitcher
 Emlyn Hughes (1947–2004), English footballer
 Lewis Moody (born 1978), English professional rugby player
 Ángel Pagán (born 1981), Puerto Rican professional baseball player
 Ram Vaswani (born 1970), English professional poker player

Other uses
 Crazyhorse (magazine), an American magazine that publishes fiction, poetry, and essays
 Crazy Horse rifle
 Crazy Horse, the original name of the BP Thunder Horse Oil Field Project

See also
 Crazy Horse Memorial
 Crazy Horse Too, a former Las Vegas strip club